Ma Yuanzhang (Xiao'erjing:) was a Chinese Sufi master, of the Jahriyya menhuan (Naqshbandi Sufi order).

Jiaozhu of the Jahriyya
Ma Mingxin's descendant was Ma Yuanzhang.

When Agui defeated Su Forty-three and the New teaching in the Jahriyya revolt of 1781, The family of Ma Mingxin was exiled to Yunnan. where they lived in the western Muslim community, converting the Yunnan Muslims to the Jahriyya sect. Ma Yuanzhang's father, Ma Shilin, travelled from Yunnan to Ningxia to visit Ma Hualong two times. After Du Wenxiu rebelled in the Panthay Rebellion, Ma Shilin joined him as a garrison commander and civil official. He defended Donggouzhai fort a year against Qing, and then committed suicide. Ma Shilin's son Ma Yuanzhang and his other sons went to Sichuan.

Ma Yuanzhang searched for surviving children of Ma Hualong. Few of Ma Hualong's family survived the massacre at Jinjipu. Two of his grandsons, Ma Jincheng and Ma Jinxi, were sentenced to castration upon reaching the age of 12. Ma Jincheng ended his days as a eunuch slave in Kaifeng in 1890, although the new Jahriyya leader, Ma Yuanzhang (the 1850s - 1920), managed to secretly provide him with some support until his death. The younger grandson, Ma Jinxi, was spirited away, intact, from his Xi'an confinement by Ma Yuanzhang, and was hidden at a Hui household in Hangzhou. Many years later, Ma Yuanzhang managed to obtain a pardon for Ma Jinxi, and Ma Hualong's grandson returned to Ningxia. A split within the Jahriyya followed, with some members becoming followers of Ma Jinxi, and others holding for Ma Yuanzhang (who claimed descent from the order's founder Ma Mingxin, and was also related to Ma Hualong's family through his marriage).

Ma Yuanzhang commanded Jahriyya militia against the Bai Lang Rebellion.

He and Ma Fuxiang became enemies after Ma Fuxiang was angry that Ma Yuanzhang refused to help him remove Zhang Guangjian as governor of Gansu and telegraphed Beijing that Zhang should remain as governor. Ma Fuxiang and other Gansu Generals believed a native of Gansu should be governor.

Ma Yuanzhang was treated with extreme respect by his adherents; he was nicknamed the "New Prophet", and his residence considered a "sanctuary".

In 1913 the revolt of Tömür Khälphä in Qumul was crushed by Yang Zengxin with the help of the Turpan-based Ma Yuanzhang's religious representative "ra'is" Jin Yunlun 金云仑.

Ma Yuanzhang and his son were then crushed to death during the 1920 Haiyuan earthquake on December 16, 1920 in the Mosque he was in near Zhangjiachuan.

Family

According to his great grandson, Ma Yuanzhang was a direct descendant of Ma Mingxin, founder of the Jahriyya, and an uncle of Ma Shaowu, and important military commander in Xinjiang. Ma Shenglin  was a great uncle of Ma Shaowu, and therefore also related to Ma Yuanzhang.

He wrote a couplet in honor of Ma Shaowu.

Couplet written in Honor of Ma Shaowu by Ma Yuanzhang 
Ten thousand li to pay his respects at the isolated tomb and satisfy the wish of the founding ancestor,
Those that satisfy the wishes of their ancestors are truly filial.
In the home province he built up the embankment in honour of the departed sage,
Not only by showing respect for the departed but in his countenance he is a true worthy descendant.

References

Hui people
Naqshbandi order
Chinese Sufis
Chinese Muslims
1920 deaths